Pekka Ruokola (born 10 February 1951) is a Finnish boxer. He competed in the men's heavyweight event at the 1976 Summer Olympics. At the 1976 Summer Olympics, he lost to Teófilo Stevenson of Cuba.

References

External links
 

1951 births
Living people
Finnish male boxers
Olympic boxers of Finland
Boxers at the 1976 Summer Olympics
People from Jämsä
Heavyweight boxers
Sportspeople from Central Finland